Valdezarza is a station on Line 7 of the Madrid Metro. It is located in fare Zone A.

References 

Line 7 (Madrid Metro) stations
Railway stations in Spain opened in 1999
Buildings and structures in Moncloa-Aravaca District, Madrid